The Western Wallop is a lost 1924 American silent Western film directed by Clifford Smith and starring Jack Hoxie. It was produced and released by the Universal Pictures.

Cast
 Jack Hoxie as Bart Tullison
 Margaret Landis as Anita Stilwell
 J. Gordon Russell as Jefferson Bradshaw
 Charles Brinley as Sheriff Malloy
 Duke R. Lee as Bandit
 Fred Burns as Marshal Malloy
 Jack Pratt as Convict Leader
 Herbert Fortier as Jim Stillwell
 Joseph W. Girard as Prison Warden
 William Welsh as Italian Convict
 Scout as Bart's horse

References

External links
 
 

1924 films
Lost American films
Universal Pictures films
Films based on short fiction
1924 Western (genre) films
Lost Western (genre) films
American black-and-white films
1924 lost films
Silent American Western (genre) films
Films directed by Clifford Smith
1920s American films